Tony Clegg (8 April 1937 – 1 June 1995) was a British property entrepreneur whose company, Mountleigh, was a stock market favourite in the 1980s.

See also
Paul Bloomfield

References 

1937 births
1995 deaths
20th-century British businesspeople